Pulia may be:
 an alternative spelling of Pulyeh, a village in Iran
 a misspelling of Puglia

See also 
 Pulya, a 1999 Russian ska-punk album